The Roman Catholic Diocese of Man is a diocese located in the city of Man in the Ecclesiastical province of Gagnoa in Côte d'Ivoire.

History
 June 8, 1968: Established as Diocese of Man from the Diocese of Daloa

Special churches
The Cathedral is the Cathédrale Saint-Michel in Man.

Leadership
 Bishops of Man (Roman rite)
 Bishop Bernard Agré (1968.06.08 – 1992.03.06), appointed Bishop of Yamoussoukro; future Cardinal
 Bishop Joseph Niangoran Teky (1992.12.17 - 2007.12.18)
 Bishop Gaspard Béby Gnéba (since 2007.12.18)

See also
Roman Catholicism in Côte d'Ivoire
 List of Roman Catholic dioceses in Côte d'Ivoire

Sources
 GCatholic.org
 Catholic Hierarchy
 Diocèse de Man (Site officiel)

Man
Christian organizations established in 1968
Roman Catholic dioceses and prelatures established in the 20th century
Montagnes District
Bafing Region
Man, Ivory Coast
1968 establishments in Ivory Coast
Roman Catholic Ecclesiastical Province of Gagnoa